Thymus camphoratus (locally known as ) is a species of flowering plant in the mint family Lamiaceae, endemic to southwest Portugal.

Description

Thymus camphoratus is an erect subshrub  in height. Young stems have a quadrangular section, with very short hairs. It has purple, exerted anthers.

Distribution and habitat
Thymus camphoratus is native to southwest Portugal, particularly in the Southwest Alentejo and Vicentine Coast Natural Park. It inhabits heathlands and xerophilic scrub on stabilized dunes of limestone based sands, always close to the coast.

References

camphoratus
Endemic flora of Portugal
Endemic flora of the Iberian Peninsula